The Scotland national football team is the joint-oldest international football team, having played in the first official international match, a goalless draw on 30 November 1872 against England. Since then, the team has established a long-standing rivalry with England, particularly in the annual British Home Championship, which Scotland won 24 times outright and shared a further 17 times. The team has enjoyed less success in continental and global competition. Even though Scotland has participated in eight FIFA World Cup and two UEFA European Championship final tournaments, the team has never progressed beyond the first round of any major tournament.

During the First World War (1914–18) and the Second World War (1939–45), competitive football was suspended for the duration of each war. Scotland played a number of "Wartime Internationals" against the other Home Nations during each conflict, none of which are considered to be official international matches. They also played Victory Internationals in the immediate aftermath of each war, although two of these (a 2–2 draw with Belgium on 23 January 1946 and a 3–1 win against Switzerland on 15 May 1946) are counted by the Scottish Football Association as official matches.

This list includes all Scotland players who appeared in these unofficial Wartime or Victory International matches. It does not include appearances in the matches played between Scotland representative teams and branches of the British Armed Forces which also took place during the course of the Second World War, nor the fixtures against Belgium and Switzerland in 1946.

List of players

See also
Association football during World War I
Association football during World War II
Scotland national football team results (unofficial matches)

References

External links
List of Scotland international results, including unofficial matches, London Hearts Supporters' Club

Wartime
 
Association football player non-biographical articles